Journey into Narnia: Prince Caspian was a one-room walk-through style attraction at Disney's Hollywood Studios theme park at Walt Disney World Resort, which opened on June 27, 2008. It replaced Journey into Narnia: Creating The Lion, the Witch, and the Wardrobe, which closed on January 1, 2008.

Summary 
The queue displayed Narnia-related trivia questions on screens. Guests then entered the pre-show area, where they viewed behind-the-scenes footage featuring the film's director, Andrew Adamson.

Passing through a rockwork archway, guests then entered "Aslan's Stone Table Chamber," the underground vault of stone carvings where Aslan sacrificed himself in the first movie, The Chronicles of Narnia: The Lion, the Witch, and the Wardrobe. 

There guests saw a short edited clip from the movie. Multiple screens, dimensional sound and in-theater effects enhanced the scene of Peter and Edmond's temptation to use the power of the White Witch against King Miraz to win back Caspian's place on the throne.

Finally, the walkthrough concluded with a look at the  concept art and storyboards from the film's production, as well as some of the actual props and costumes used by the cast and crew.

Closure 
"Journey into Narnia: Prince Caspian" closed on September 10, 2011. The attraction was replaced by The Legend Of Captain Jack Sparrow, opened on December 6, 2012.

References

The Chronicles of Narnia (film series)
Disney's Hollywood Studios
Former Walt Disney Parks and Resorts attractions
2008 establishments in Florida
2011 disestablishments in Florida